Frost is a city in Navarro County, Texas, United States. The population was 643 at the 2010 census.

Geography

Frost is located at  (32.079218, –96.808544).

Frost, Texas was founded by 5th generation Texan, Miles Frost in 1899 as a trading post for north central Texas farmers.

The town was established in 1881 when the St. Louis Southwestern Railway was constructed through Frost on its way from Corsicana to Hillsboro.  It was named after Samuel R. Frost, attorney for the railroad and prominent local politician.

Demographics
As of the census of 2000, there were 648 people, 225 households, and 175 families residing in the city. The population density was 572.8 people per square mile (221.4/km2). There were 250 housing units at an average density of 221.0 per square mile (85.4/km2). The racial makeup of the city was 78.40% White, 7.25% African American, 0.15% Native American, 1.23% Asian, 12.35% from other races, and 0.62% from two or more races. Hispanic or Latino of any race were 17.13% of the population.

There were 225 households, out of which 42.2% had children under the age of 18 living with them, 60.9% were married couples living together, 11.6% had a female householder with no husband present, and 22.2% were non-families. 20.4% of all households were made up of individuals, and 13.3% had someone living alone who was 65 years of age or older. The average household size was 2.84 and the average family size was 3.29.

In the city, the population was spread out, with 31.3% under the age of 18, 9.1% from 18 to 24, 28.4% from 25 to 44, 17.9% from 45 to 64, and 13.3% who were 65 years of age or older. The median age was 33 years. For every 100 females, there were 100.0 males. For every 100 females age 18 and over, there were 89.4 males.

The median income for a household in the city was $33,750, and the median income for a family was $38,382. Males had a median income of $30,469 versus $19,688 for females. The per capita income for the city was $17,350. About 13.7% of families and 15.5% of the population were below the poverty line, including 15.0% of those under age 18 and 8.8% of those age 65 or over.

Education
The City of Frost is served by the Frost Independent School District.

Climate
The climate in this area is characterized by hot, humid summers and generally mild to cool winters.  According to the Köppen Climate Classification system, Frost has a humid subtropical climate, abbreviated "Cfa" on climate maps.

Cultural references 
On May 6, 1930, a tornado struck the city, destroying many buildings and leaving 41 dead. The event was commemorated in the song "Frost Texas Tornado Blues" by Texas Alexander and the Mississippi Sheiks, recorded April 9, 1934 in San Antonio, Texas on the Okeh label.

Photo Gallery

References

Cities in Texas
Cities in Navarro County, Texas